Colonial School District is a name shared by several school districts in the United States.

 Colonial School District of New Castle County, Delaware
 Colonial School District of Montgomery County, Pennsylvania

See also
 Colonial School, Paris, a defunct higher education institution in France